Illingworth v Houldsworth [1904] AC 355 (known as or Re Yorkshire Woolcombers Association in the Court of Appeal) is a UK insolvency law case, concerning the taking of a security interest over a company's assets with a floating charge. In the Court of Appeal Romer LJ held that a key to a floating charge, as opposed to a fixed charge was that the company can carry on its business with assets subject to the charge.

The case is fairly unusual in English law in that is more frequently cited for the Court of Appeal's decision than for the subsequent decision of the House of Lords.  This is principally because of the attempt by Romer LJ to describe or define the core characteristics of a floating charge.  Despite stating explicitly: "I certainly do not intend to attempt to give an exact definition of the term 'floating charge,'" his description has been almost universally accepted and endorsed.  The three core characteristics which he identified were:
 The charge is on a class of assets of a company, present and future; 
 that class is one which, in the ordinary course of the business of the company, would be changing from time to time; and 
 until some future step is taken by or on behalf of the chargee, the company may carry on its business in the ordinary way and deal with the assets within the particular class of assets.

Facts
The Yorkshire Woolcombers Association Ltd had borrowed money from various guarantors, and in a trust deed of 23 April 1900, it said it was giving a floating charge to the guarantors to secure the money. Further guarantees were given to the guarantor's bank, the Bradford District Bank Ltd, and the guarantors were pressing for repayment. With debts still outstanding, the Association organised a further deal on 25 October 1902. Mr Frederick Illingworth, on behalf of the guarantors, agreed with the Association to have a charge over the company's book debts. It called this an "indemnity and specific security", and said that being assigned were “all and singular the book and other debts now owing to the association, and also all and singular the book and other debts which may at any time during the continuance of this security become owing to the association (but not including uncalled capital of the association), and the full benefit of all the securities for the said present and future book and other debts”. On 21 November 1902, Mr Illingworth appointed a receiver to call in the book debts (a large sum, amounting to £71,000). Receivers of the other creditors were quickly appointed on 25 November, and contended that the deed from 25 October 1902 was void, because it was not registered, as floating charges were meant to be, under the Companies Act 1900 section 14(1) (now Companies Act 2006, section 860).

Judgment

Court of Appeal
The Court of Appeal held that the charge in question was floating, and so was void because it was not registered. Vaughan Williams LJ gave the first judgment.  Romer LJ said a charge is "floating" if it (1) is a charge on present and future assets (2) the class of assets changes in the ordinary course of business, and (3) the company can deal with the assets in business as usual.

House of Lords
The House of Lords affirmed Romer LJ's decision. Lord Halsbury LC held the following.

Lord MacNaghten agreed.

In that case he stated: "Everybody knows that when there is a winding-up debenture-holders generally step in and sweep off everything; and a great scandal it is."

Lord James and Lord Lindley concurred.

See also

UK insolvency law
Royal Trust Bank v National Westminster Bank plc [1996] BCC 613, Millett LJ, overturning Jonathan Parker J [1995] BCC 128 held the expression that a charge is ‘fixed’ or ‘floating’ in a contract is not conclusive. Substance prevails over form.

Notes

References
L Sealy and S Worthington, Cases and Materials in Company Law (8th edn OUP 2008) 460

United Kingdom company case law
United Kingdom insolvency case law
House of Lords cases
1904 in case law
1904 in British law